Hanover Street may refer to:
A street in central London, United Kingdom, going from Regent Street to Hanover Square, London
Hanover Street (film), a 1979 World War II film, named after the London street
Hanover Street, Baltimore, Maryland, part of Maryland Route 2
Hanover Street (Boston, Massachusetts)
A major street in the New Town, Edinburgh